Panamenik (also, Koomen and Pa-nom-nik) is a former Karok settlement in Humboldt County, California. The elevation of Panamenik is 413 feet (126 m).

References

Former settlements in Humboldt County, California
Former Native American populated places in California
Karuk villages